The 1927 All-Southwest Conference football team consists of American football players chosen by various sports writers and officials for All-Southwest Conference teams for the 1927 college football season.

All Southwest selections

Quarterbacks
 Joel Hunt, Texas A&M (AP-1, Duby-1, DM-1, ASR-1, MS-1 [hb], WTH-1)

Halfbacks
 Gerald Mann, SMU (AP-1, Duby-1, DM-1, ASR-1, MS-1 [qb], WTH-1)
 George Cole, Arkansas (AP-1, Duby-1 [fb], DM-1, ASR-1, MS-1 [fb], WTH-1)
 Joe King, Texas (Duby-1)

Fullbacks
 Redman Hume, SMU (AP-1, DM-1, ASR-1, MS-1 [hb], WTH-1)

Ends
 Rags Matthews, TCU (AP-1, Duby-1, DM-1, ASR-1, MS-1, WTH-1)
 Jules V. Sikes, Texas A&M (AP-1, ASR-1)
 Glen Rose, Arkansas (Duby-1, DM-1, MS-1)
 Dawson, SMU (WTH-1)

Tackles
 Lister, Texas A&M (AP-1, MS-1)
 Roach, SMU (AP-1, MS-1)
 Sprott, Texas A&M (DM-1, ASR-1, WTH-1)
 Higgins, Texas (Duby-1, WTH-1 [g])
 Brown, Texas (DM-1, ASR-1)
 Jake Williams, TCU (Duby-1)

Guards
 Klepto Holmes, Texas A&M (AP-1, MS-1)
 Sewell, Texas (AP-1, Duby-1, DM-1, ASR-1)
 Figari, Texas A&M (Duby-1, DM-1, WTH-1)
 Tatum, SMU (ASR-1, MS-1, WTH-1 [t])

Centers
 Pottie McCullough, Texas (AP-1, Duby-1, DM-1, ASR-1)
 Bartlett, Texas A&M (MS-1)
 Smith, Baylor (WTH-1)

Key

 AP = Associated Press

 Duby = Duby (Hugh DuBose, sports editor of the Austin Statesman-American)

 DM = Dick McMurray, Austin Statesman

 ASR = Austin Statesman readers

 MS = Milt Saul of the Dallas News

 WTH = Waco Times-Herald based on voting by 162 fans and readers

See also
 1927 College Football All-America Team

References

All-Southwest Conference
All-Southwest Conference football teams